The Teslim Balogun Stadium is a multi-use stadium in Surulere, Lagos, Nigeria.  It is used mostly for football matches and serves as a home ground of First Bank FC. The Nigeria national rugby league team also use the venue. The stadium has a capacity of 24,325 people, and is sometimes used for international football matches. It once served as the venue for the Nigerian Cup final, just before it hosted some matches in the 2009 FIFA U-17 World Cup youth tournament held in Nigeria. It sits adjacent to the Lagos National Stadium.

Overview
It is named after former professional footballer Teslim Balogun.

The stadium is located directly opposite the multipurpose National Stadium.

Started in 1984 under the administration of military governor Gbolahan Mudasiru, construction continually stalled under military regimes and the stadium became a white elephant. By the time the stadium was completed in 2007, it had taken 23 years to build and cost over
N1.3 billion.

As recently as 2006, it was occupied by homeless people and area boys.

The first event held in the stadium was the 18th Mobil Track and Field Athletics Championship on 17 May. The
first football game was an international friendly on 28 May between Enyimba and Asante Kotoko. The stadium also hosted the Nigeria Premier League Super Four playoff that season and the Nigerian FA Cup final in 2007. The final of the 2009 Federation Cup between Enyimba and Sharks was held at the stadium.

Lagos State Commissioner for Youth Sports and Social Development, Prince Ademola Adeniji-Adele disclosed at the FIFA Media Briefing Room of the Teslim Balogun Stadium on 18 May 2009 on the preparations for FIFA U-17 World Cup that "with a FIFA Star Two artificial turf, FIFA Grade seats with back rest, a seating capacity of 24,325, a 70 kVA electricity generating set for the digital scoreboard, state of art changing room for athletes and officials, security gadgets with CCTV cameras, a 1,000 kVA and 500 kVA generating sets and other standard facilities, I know we are set to host a successful championship."

The Teslim Balogun stadium was also the main venue of the 18th National Sports festival in December 2012.

With 114 gold, 99 silver, and 75 bronze medals, Delta took the top spot on the medal stand and emerge winners of the 18th National sport Festival.

In 2018, during the Nigerian Independence day (1 October 2018); The Crawford Age grade competition was held at the Olympic Standard swimming pool of the stadium.

Architecture
The stadium was designed by Nigerian Architect O.C. Majoroh of Majoroh Partnership.

Notable football matches

2009 FIFA U-17 World Cup

References

External links
 Venue information
 October 2006
 Lagos Govt spends N1.4b on Balogun Stadium
 Enyimba, Kotoko baptise Teslim Balogun pitch
 Teslim Balogun To Host Principal's Cup
 

Football venues in Nigeria
Sport in Lagos
Sports venues completed in 2007
Sports venues in Lagos
21st-century architecture in Nigeria